Vasily Grigorevich Perov (2 January 1834 (21 December 1833 O.S.) – 10 June (29 May O.S.) 1882) was a Russian painter, a key figure of the Russian Realist movement and one of the founding members of Peredvizhniki.

Life and career

Vasily Perov was born on 2 January 1834 (21 December 1833 Old Style) in Tobolsk, Tobolsk Governorate, Russian Empire, as Vasily Grigorevich Vasiliev (Васи́лий Григо́рьевич Васильев). Perov was an illegitimate son of the local procurator baron, Baron Gregor Gustav Friedrich von Krüdener, who belonged to a German and Baltic German noble family, which belonged to the Uradel, and Akulina Ivanova, a native citizen of Tobolsk. Although Perov's parents married soon after his birth, there was no legal way to inherit his father's name and baron title, so he was registered under his godfather's surname — Vasiliev. He later changed his surname to Perov — a nickname given to him by his teacher who taught him calligraphy as a child (the word pero means feather in Russian).

After completing a course at Arzamas uyezd school, Perov was transferred to the Alexander Stupin art school also located in Arzamas. In 1853, Perov was admitted to the Moscow School of Painting, Sculpture and Architecture in Moscow, where he learned from several renowned artists.

In 1856, Perov was awarded with a minor silver medal, presented to the Imperial Academy of Arts, for his sketch of a boy's head. Later the Academy gave him many other awards: in 1857 a major silver medal for Commissary of Rural Police Investigating, a minor golden medal for the Scene on a Grave and the Son of a Dyak Promoted to First Rank, and in 1861 a major golden medal for Sermon in a Village.

In 1862, after receiving the right to a state-paid trip abroad together with a golden medal, Perov traveled to Western Europe, visiting several German cities, and then Paris. During this time he created paintings depicting scenes from European streetlife, such as the Vendor of statuettes, the Savoyard, the Organ-Grinder in Paris, the Musicians and the Bystanders, and the Paris Ragpickers.
Returning to Moscow early, from 1865 to 1871 Perov created his best known pieces, The Queue at The Fountain,  A Meal in the Monastery, Last Journey, Troika, the Lent Monday, Arrival of a New Governess in a Merchant House, the Drawing Teacher, A Scene at the Railroad, the Last Tavern at Town Gate, the Birdcatcher, the Fisherman, and the Hunters at Rest. 
In 1866, Perov received the title of an academician, and in 1871 the position of a Professor at Moscow School of Arts, Sculpture and Architecture.  It was around this period that Perov joined the Peredvizhniki, a collective of Russian realist painters formed as an artists cooperative in protest of academic restrictions.

Perov died on 10 June (29 May O.S.), 1882 in the village Kuzminki, now Kuzminki District of Moscow) from tuberculosis, and his body was interred at the Donskoy Cemetery.

Selected works

References

External links

Perov at Olga's Gallery
Artists Illustrating Boys Fashions: Vasily Perov (Russia, 1834-82)
 Vasily Perov at Tanais Gallery

1833 births
1882 deaths
People from Tobolsk
People from Tobolsky Uyezd
Russian realist painters
Peredvizhniki
Russian male painters
19th-century painters from the Russian Empire
Tuberculosis deaths in Russia
19th-century deaths from tuberculosis
19th-century male artists from the Russian Empire
Moscow School of Painting, Sculpture and Architecture alumni
Academic staff of the Moscow School of Painting, Sculpture and Architecture